Winners of the Gospel Music Association Dove Award for Songwriter of the Year are: 
 1969: Bill Gaither
 1970: Bill Gaither
 1971: Award vacated because of 1971 GMA vote-buying scandal
 Had been won by Bill Gaither before nullification
 1972: Bill Gaither
 1973: Bill Gaither
 1974: Bill Gaither
 1975: Bill Gaither
 1976: Bill Gaither
 1977: Bill Gaither
 1978: Dallas Holm
 1980: Don Francisco (Awards moved from September to April)
 1981: Gary Chapman
 1982: Dottie Rambo
 1983: Michael Card
 1984: Lanny Wolfe
 1985: Michael W. Smith
 1986: Gloria Gaither
 1987: Dick and Melodie Tunney
 1988: Larnelle Harris
 1989: Steven Curtis Chapman
 1990: Steven Curtis Chapman
 1991: Steven Curtis Chapman
 1992: Steven Curtis Chapman
 1993: Steven Curtis Chapman
 1994: Steven Curtis Chapman
 1995: Steven Curtis Chapman
 1996: Michael W. Smith
 1997: Steven Curtis Chapman
 1998: Steven Curtis Chapman
 1999: Rich Mullins
 2000: Michael W. Smith
 2001: Nicole C. Mullen
 2002: Bart Millard (of MercyMe)
 2003: Nichole Nordeman
 2004: Mark Hall
 2005: Mark Hall
 2006: Christa Wells
 2007: Aaron Shust
 2008: Cindy Morgan
 2009: Steven Curtis Chapman
 2010: Jennie Lee Riddle
 2011: Gerald Crabb
 2012: Michael Boggs
 2013: Matt Redman
 2014: Chris Tomlin
 2015: Matt Maher (artist), Seth Mosley (non-artist)
 2016: Lauren Daigle (artist), Jason Ingram (non-artist)
 2017: Bart Millard (artist), Bernie Herms (non-artist)
 2018: Matthew West (artist), Colby Wedgeworth (non-artist)
 2019: Bart Millard (artist), Jason Ingram (non-artist)
 2020: Zach Williams (artist), Jason Ingram (non-artist)
 2021: Brandon Lake (artist), Jason Ingram (non-artist)
 2022: Phil Wickham (artist), Jason Ingram (non-artist)

References

GMA Dove Awards